Melissa Sagemiller is an American television and film actress. She is known for her performances in films Get Over It (2001), Soul Survivors (2001), Sorority Boys (2002), The Clearing (2004), The Guardian (2006) and Mr. Woodcock (2007). Sagemiller also starred in television dramas Sleeper Cell (2005–06), and Raising the Bar (2008–09), and from 2010 to 2011 had the recurring role as A.D.A. Gillian Hardwicke in the Law & Order: Special Victims Unit.

Early life
Sagemiller was born June 1, 1974, in Washington, D.C., to Donna Sagemiller, a political activist mother who worked as a comptroller during Jimmy Carter's presidency, and Charlie Evans, a professional American football player father, who played in the NFL for the New York Giants and the Washington Redskins. She attended Georgetown Day School. Her entry into the performing arts was at age 3 when she began studying tap dance, ballet, jazz dance and modern dance. She made her stage debut in To Kill a Mockingbird when she was 9 years old, and soon after she became a regular on her local stage. At 14, however, acting took a backseat to modeling after Sagemiller was scouted by Eileen Ford in a jewelry shop. She eventually left modeling to take an undergraduate degree in Art History at the University of Virginia.

Career
Shortly after graduation, she decided to return to acting full-time, and studied at the Stella Adler Conservatory, New York University's Stonestreet Studio and at Michael Howard Studios. Sagemiller was mentioned in Movieline magazine in August 2001. In November 2001, Sagemiller appeared in Gear magazine. In early career, she starred on number of teen films, like Get Over It and Sorority Boys, and was lead actress in 2002 thriller Soul Survivors.

On television, Sagemiller portrayed the character Michelle Ernhardt in the TNT series Raising the Bar from 2008 to 2009. After that series was cancelled, Sagemiller joined Law & Order: Special Victims Unit in a recurring role as ADA Gillian Hardwicke. She replaced Paula Patton when Patton departed the series after just one episode. Sagemiller was featured in ten episodes of the 12th season of the series. She was replaced in the 13th season by Stephanie March and Diane Neal. In 2013, she was cast as a lead on Chicago Fire spinoff Chicago P.D., but left during pre-production.

Sagemiller is one of numerous actresses who have accused Harvey Weinstein of sexual assault and harassment.

Personal life
Sagemiller became engaged in July 2006 to her Sleeper Cell co-star Alex Nesic after he proposed to her in the South of France. The couple have two children.

Filmography

Film

Television

References

External links
 

Year of birth missing (living people)
Actresses from Washington, D.C.
American film actresses
American television actresses
Living people
University of Virginia alumni
21st-century American actresses
Georgetown Day School alumni